Jakub Vrána (born 28 February 1996) is a Czech professional ice hockey forward for the  St. Louis Blues of the National Hockey League (NHL). Vrána was selected by the Washington Capitals in the first round, 13th overall, of the 2014 NHL Entry Draft. Vrána won the Stanley Cup as a member of the Capitals in 2018.

Early life
Vrána was born on 28 February 1996, in Prague to parents Jana and Karel. He began skating at a rink owned by the brother of former Capitals scout Vojtech Kucera before moving away from home at 15 to play in the Swedish Hockey League (SHL). Vrána played in the 2009 Quebec International Pee-Wee Hockey Tournament with his minor ice hockey team from Chomutov.

Playing career

SHL
Vrána made his Elitserien debut playing with Linköping HC during the 2012–13 season. Upon making his Elitserien debut in October 2012, Vrána became the youngest foreign player in the history of the league and the ninth-youngest overall. He subsequently spent the following season splitting his time between Linkoping's junior and senior team. Vrána registered three points and two penalty minutes in 24 games with the senior team and collected 25 points in 24 games with the junior club. At the conclusion of the 2013–14 season, Vrána was ranked fourth overall among European skaters by the NHL Central Scouting Bureau.

Washington Capitals

Vrána was eventually drafted in the first round, 13th overall, by the Washington Capitals in the 2014 NHL Entry Draft. After the 2014 draft, Vrána attended the Capitals development camp and signed a three-year, entry-level contract. Vrána was subsequently returned to Sweden for the entirety of the 2014–15 season before joining the Capitals American Hockey League (AHL) affiliate, the Hershey Bears, for three regular season games. Vrána then began his first full professional season in North America with the Bears during their 2015–16 season. He tallied two goals and four assists through six games with the Bears before suffering a wrist injury. He missed about three months of the regular season after undergoing wrist surgery but still finished the regular season with 16 goals with 18 assists through 36 games. Vrána continued to score for the Bears during their post-season run and tallied eight goals and six assists through 21 games.

During the 2016 off-season, Vrána worked on gaining weight and returned to the Capitals development camp 10 pounds heavier. In his second season in North America, Vrána once again began with the Hershey Bears but received his first NHL call-up on 29 November 2016. At the time of the recall, he registered 16 points through 18 games and was tied for third in the league in goals. He subsequently made his NHL debut on 1 December against the New York Islanders and skated on the Capitals second line with Evgeny Kuznetsov and André Burakovsky. A few games later, on 9 December, Vrána scored his first NHL goal in a 4–1 win over the Buffalo Sabres. Vrána also tallied his first multi-point game with two assists on 13 December against the Islanders. After recording three points through 12 games, he was reassigned to the Bears on 1 January 2017. Vrána was recalled again the following month but was reassigned without playing a single game. However, following injuries to the Capitals lineup, Vrána and Zach Sanford were recalled to the NHL level on 17 February.

Vrána made the Capitals opening night roster for the 2017–18 season. His rookie season was considered a "roller-coaster", ending up 13 goals scored and 14 assists in 73 games. He made his Stanley Cup playoffs debut during the 2018 playoffs, providing the "speedy, offensive complement to the shutdown duo" of Nicklas Bäckström and T. J. Oshie on Washington's second line. Vrána scored his first Stanley Cup playoffs goal on 29 April 2018 against the Pittsburgh Penguins. The Capitals would go on to defeat the Penguins in six games and then win the Eastern Conference by defeating the Tampa Bay Lightning in seven games. He scored the opening goal in game five of the 2018 Stanley Cup Finals against the Vegas Golden Knights which resulted in the Capitals' victory. Vrána ended the playoffs with eight points in 23 games to help the Capitals win their first Stanley Cup.

During the 2018–19 season, Vrána set career highs in goals, assists, and points, while also ranking third on the team in goals. He also became the 15th player in franchise history to record at least 24 goals in a single season before the age of 24. As a result of his success, the Capitals re-signed Vrána to a new two-year, $6.7 million contract on 16 July 2019.

Detroit Red Wings
On 12 April 2021, Vrána was traded to the Detroit Red Wings, along with Richard Pánik, a first-round pick in 2021 and a second-round pick in 2022, in exchange for Anthony Mantha. Upon joining the team, Vrána tallied 11 points through 11 games and tied numerous franchise records. During a game against the Dallas Stars on 22 April, Vrána became the 26th player in Red Wings history to score four-or-more goals in a game and the second player in franchise history to record a hat trick within his first four games of joining the team.

On 10 August 2021, Vrána signed a three-year, $16.25 million contract with the Red Wings. Following the signing, Vrána was injured during the first 10 minutes of Red Wings practice and was expected to miss three to four months. Vrána only played 26 games in the 2021–22 season due to his injury, but contributed 13 goals and six assists in his shortened season. On 19 October 2022, Vrána was placed in the NHL's "Player Assistance Program."

In January 2023, the Red Wings placed Vrána on waivers for the purpose of assigning him to the team's AHL affiliate, the Grand Rapids Griffins. Vrana cleared waivers without being claimed by another team.

St. Louis Blues
On 3 March 2023, the Red Wings traded Vrána to the St. Louis Blues in exchange for prospect Dylan McLaughlin and a seventh-round pick in the 2025 NHL Entry Draft.

Career statistics

Regular season and playoffs

International

Awards and honors

References

External links
 

1996 births
Living people
Czech expatriate ice hockey players in Sweden
Czech expatriate ice hockey players in the United States
Czech ice hockey left wingers
Detroit Red Wings players
Grand Rapids Griffins players
Hershey Bears players
Ice hockey people from Prague
Linköping HC players
National Hockey League first-round draft picks
St. Louis Blues players
Stanley Cup champions
Washington Capitals draft picks
Washington Capitals players